The Perpetual Virginity of Blessed Mary is an apologetic work of Saint Jerome (–420). It is an answer to Helvidius.

Helvidius was the author of a work written about the year 383 against the belief in the perpetual virginity of Mary (the mother of Jesus).

Saint Jerome maintains against Helvidius three propositions:
That Joseph was only putatively, not really, the husband of Mary.
That the "brothers" of the Lord were his cousins, not his own brothers.
That virginity is better than the married state.

See also
Brothers of Jesus

Sources

External links

 
 

4th-century Christian texts
Works by Jerome
Sexuality in Christianity